The Liquid Roofing and Waterproofing Association (LRWA) is a UK member organisation of manufacturers of liquid applied coatings for buildings.  The association's aim is to educate and inform specifiers, contractors, and the industry as to the properties, correct applications, installation methods, and aftercare of liquid waterproofing systems.

History
The association was formed in the 1970s and was originally known as the BRCMA (Bituminous Roof Coating Manufacturers Association). The primary purpose of the association was to promote good practice in all areas of the UK bituminous roof coatings industry.

The late 1980s and early 1990s saw the rise in popularity of non-bituminous products and in particular liquid roofing.

Recognising this trend, the association reinvented itself as ELRA (European Liquid Roofing Association), now focusing solely on liquid roofing systems. The 'European' tag reflected the associations involvement in the drafting of European standards for all areas of liquid roofing.

In 2005 a second reinvention took place as ELRA became ELWA (European Liquid Waterproofing Association) in recognition of the wider applications for liquid waterproofing products, for example the protection and waterproofing of car park decks.

In 2010 the association identified a need for an industry voice for liquid roofing, which was and remains the fastest growing sector of the roofing market in the UK. The 'European' label was dropped as the association re-launched as LRWA (Liquid Roofing and Waterproofing Association).

Members
LRWA members fall into one of three categories:

Membrane manufacturers

UK manufacturers (and wholly owned subsidiaries) of liquid applied waterproofing products. LRWA's membrane manufacturers membership includes 90% of the UK Liquid Roofing market.

Associates

UK manufacturers of ancillary materials and components used in conjunction with LRWA's membrane manufacturer members' liquid waterproofing systems. LRWA's Associate members' specialisms include the manufacture of thermal and acoustic insulation, vapour control layers, drainage, plant and safety equipment.

Contractors

LRWA's Contractor membership is made up of UK roofing contractors approved or licensed to receive and install the products of LRWA's manufacturer members.

References

External links
 LRWA - Liquid Applied Roofing and Waterproofing Association
 Triflex - European manufacturer of liquid roofing, walkway, balcony, terrace and car park systems
 Kemper System - Global manufacturer of liquid roofing.
 Tor Coatings - UK manufacturer of liquid roofing and balcony waterproofing coating systems
 Roof Waterproofing Services - Roof Waterproofing Services
 Roof Heatproofing - Roof Heatproofing

Construction trade groups based in the United Kingdom
Organisations based in the London Borough of Islington
Paint and coatings industry